Sticking may refer to:

 Sticking coefficient, a surface physics concept
 Sticking knife, an agricultural tool used for bleeding out livestock in home butchering

See also

 Stick (disambiguation)
 Stuck (disambiguation)